GMA Regional TV Live!  is a 2020 Philippine television news broadcasting program broadcast by GMA Cebu. Originally and currently hosted by Nikko Sereno and Cecille Quibod-Castro, it premiered on April 20, 2020 on the network's morning line up.

Overview
The show premiered on GMA Cebu on April 20, 2020 and is simulcast on GMA 11 Bohol, GMA TV-5 Dumaguete, GMA 10 Tacloban, GMA TV-5 Calbayog, GMA TV-8 Borongan and GMA 12 Ormoc. It marked the return of GMA Regional TV's producing morning news programs five years after its predecessor Buena Mano Balita went off the air following the a strategic streamlining of programs and manpower in its provincial stations. GMA Regional TV Live! boasts of segments that highlight positive features and stories of people, specifically that of Kapusong Bisdak or Cebuanos.

Starting February 6, 2023, the program is aired live in front of a studio audience.

Segments
 Unang Balita
 GMA Integrated News Weather Center
 Lahi Ra!
 Biztalk
 Spotlight
 Pabawon

Hosts
 Nikko Sereno
 Cecille Quibod-Castro

References

2020 Philippine television series debuts
GMA Network news shows
GMA Integrated News and Public Affairs shows
Philippine television news shows
Television in Cebu City